Gwanghwamun Square (also known as Gwanghwamun Plaza) is a public square on Sejongno, Jongno-gu, Seoul, South Korea. Serving as a public space and at times road for centuries of Korean history, it also historically significant as the location of royal administrative buildings, known as Yukjo-geori or Street of Six Ministries; and features statues of Admiral Yi Sun-sin of Joseon Dynasty and King Sejong the Great of Joseon.

History

The area of Gwanghwamun Square has a long history, and by the Joseon Dynasty it had become the central point of Seoul. The square began to suffer from neglect during the Japanese colonial period, faced damage during the Korean War and then was used as a 16-lane roadway in the 20th century.

A new pedestrian-friendly, open urban space intended to restore the square was first announced in February 2004, along with projects for Namdaemun and Seoul Plaza, forming part of the city’s urban renewal plans for environmentally friendly renovation projects. In December 2006, further plans for the square were announced. The project, in conjunction with the restoration of Gwanghwamun, was carried out by the Cultural Heritage Administration of Korea and scheduled for completion by August 2009. Construction of the square was originally scheduled to begin in February 2008, however it was delayed because of opposition from the National Police Agency, who were concerned that the square could be abused as a venue for mass protests. Construction commenced on 23 April 2008, after the Government decreed it a demonstration-free zone.

The plans included moving the old King Sejong statue from Deoksugung to the Square. However, after surveys of citizens and experts, it was decided to commission a new statue of King Sejong in a sitting position and chose the design in a competition between a shortlist of artists recommended by the Korean Fine Arts Association and universities.

It is in front of Gwanghwamun and stretches south from the three-way intersection, along the front of the Sejong Center for the Performing Arts on the west side and Kyobo Book Centre on the east side, to the Sejong-ro intersection, where the statue of the Admiral Yi Sun-sin stands. At its opening, the square was covered with a 162 m long and 17.5 m wide flower carpet, with 224,537 flowers representing the number of days from when Seoul was declared the capital on 28 October 1394, to the opening of the square on 1 August 2009.

From end of 2020 to August 2022, Gwanghwamun Square was closed and redesigned. During the renovation, Sejong-daero was reduced to 6 lanes and the pedestrian plaza more than doubled in size. The expanded plaza reopened on 6 August 2022.

Landmarks

The square features a water fountain in honor of the achievements of Admiral Yi Sun-sin. It is named the 12.23 Fountain, to commemorates the 23 battles he fought with 12 warships, when he led Koreans to victory during the Japanese invasions of Korea (1592–1598). The water jets rises to a height of 18 meters along with 300 smaller jets, which symbolize the battles he fought on the sea. It also has a waterway, two centimeters deep and one meter across, at 365 meters along the square’s east side. The floor of it has 617 stones recording the major events from 1392 to 2008.The fountain is located next to the statue of Admiral Yi Sun-shin. This statue was erected on April 27, 1968. On 9 October 2009, two months after the Square’s opening, a second statue, the 6.2-meter high, 20-ton bronze statue of King Sejong the Great of Joseon was unveiled to the public. It is located 250 meters behind the statue of the Admiral Yi Sun-sin. It was dedicated on Hangul Day in celebration of the 563rd anniversary of the invention of the Korean alphabet by King Sejong.

Underneath the statues there is a small exhibition hall and museum about the two historical figures depicted the statues.

Administration
Rallies and demonstrations are illegal at the Square and the Seoul Metropolitan Government has decreed that it is to use for cultural exhibitions and a demonstration-free zone.

As of 1 June 2011, the Square along with Seoul Plaza are designated as smoke-free zones by the Seoul Metropolitan Government. Smokers are fined  in violation.

On 23 September 2012, the Government started on a trial basis, a 550-m designated section of Sejong-ro as pedestrian-only but permitted for cyclists. The section includes the road from the Gwanghwamun three-way intersection, along the plaza in front of the Sejong Center for the Performing Arts to the Sejong-ro intersection.

Events
The Square is the location for the start of the annual Seoul International Marathon, which finishes within the Olympic Stadium.

In the first winter after its opening the Square hosted an open air ice-rink from 12 December 2009 to 15 February 2010. The public rink was 2,250 sq. m, which was larger than the one at Seoul Plaza at 2,100 sq. m.

The plaza was one of the sites of street cheering during the 2002 FIFA World Cup.

In popular culture
On 29 November 2009, parts of Sejong-ro were closed to traffic for twelve hours to film lengthy gunfight scenes for Korean Broadcasting System (KBS)'s 2009 spy action television drama series Iris, starring Lee Byung-hun, Kim Tae-hee, Jung Joon-ho, Kim Seung-woo and Kim So-yeon. The five lanes along the squaee in front of the Sejong Center for the Performing Arts were closed to traffic from 07:00 to 19:00, while the five lanes on the Kyobo Book Centre side remains open to traffic. This marks the first time the Seoul Metropolitan Government has granted permission to blocked traffic along the Square for filming and it is part of Government's plans to promote the city's major tourist attractions; including Cheonggye Stream and Han River.

On 26 July 2012 at 23:00, boy band Beast held a guerilla concert at the Gwanghwamun end of the sqaure, in front of an audience of 4,000 people. It was part of their promotion for their fifth mini album Midnight Sun, and the performance was broadcast on SBS's music show Inkigayo.

In 2012, the square was used as a filming location for tvN drama Queen and I, where the two lead characters Kim Boong-do and Choi Hee-jin, played by Ji Hyun-woo and Yoo In-na, share a kiss dubbed the 'Gwanghwamun kiss' against the backdrop of Gwanghwamun.

Kyuhyun, of boy band Super Junior, used the location as a theme for his 2014 chart-topping single, "At Gwanghwamun", and his label-mate Jo Sung-mo, of TRAX, recorded a live electric guitar cover of the song with Gwanghwamun Gate in the background.

The square was a major site of the 2016-17 protests against Park Geun-hye's government. 

Nowadays, it is used for many festivals and events. Recently, a festival called ", was held on September 16 and 17, 2017. Public artists and citizens participated in this festival.

Transport
 Gwanghwamun Station on Seoul Subway Line 5: Exit 9 - Haechi Madang, an underground walkway that connects the station to the Plaza

See also
Cheonggyecheon

References

External links

Gwanghwamun Plaza : Official Seoul City Tourism

Jongno District
History of Seoul
Squares in Seoul
Tourist attractions in Seoul
2009 establishments in South Korea